Josefa Madamba Llanes Escoda (20 September 1898 – 6 January 1945) was a Filipino civic leader, social worker, World War II heroine, and suffragette. She is most known for campaigning for women's suffrage and as a founder of the Girl Scouts of the Philippines.

Together with José Abad Santos and Vicente Lim, she is memorialized on the Philippines' 1,000-Peso banknote depicting Filipinos who fought and died resisting the Japanese occupation of the Philippines during the Second World War at the Far Eastern University in Manila.

Early life
Llanes-Escoda was born in Dingras, Ilocos Norte as Josefa Llanes y Madamba. She was the eldest of the seven children of Mercedes Madamba and Gabriel Llanes. Josefa's siblings were Florencio, Luisa, Elvira, Rosario, Purita, and Eufrocina. Josefa's nickname was Pepa as a child. She grew up as a Christian. 

Llanes-Escoda graduated as valedictorian in grade school and salutatorian in high school from Dingras Elementary School (Dingras, Ilocos Norte). She went to Philippine Normal School in Manila to earn her teaching degree, and graduated with honors in 1919. While working as a teacher, she earned a high school teacher's certificate from the University of the Philippines in 1922.

After obtaining her teacher's certificate, she became a social worker for the Philippine Chapter of the American Red Cross. The Red Cross granted her a scholarship to the United States, where she earned a master's degree in Sociology from Columbia University in 1925. She also held a position in the National Federation of Women's Clubs (NFWC), serving as executive secretary in 1923, and later serving as president from 1941 to 1944. While in the United States, Josefa joined a group of foreign students who supported an International House project in New York. During her free time in the International House, she accepted speaking engagements. It was also her practice to wear a Filipiniana dress during her lecture tours to promote foreigners' interest in Philippines.

During her first trip to the United States, while she was at the Women's International League for Peace (1925), she met Antonio Escoda Sr., a businessman from Gandara, Samar whom she later married. They had two children: Maria Theresa (who later became the President of the Cultural Center of the Philippines during the 1980s) and Antonio Jr.

Girl Scouts of the Philippines

Llanes-Escoda returned to the Philippines again in the 1940s after undergoing intensified training in Girl Scouting in USA sponsored by the Boy Scouts of the Philippines. After, she began to train young women to become girl scout leaders, then proceeded to organize the Girl Scouts of the Philippines. On 26 May 1940, President Manuel L. Quezon signed the charter of the Girl Scouts of the Philippines. Josefa became the group's first National Executive.

World War II
During World War II, Japanese forces invaded the Philippines. By 1944, news of the underground activities of Josefa Llanes Escoda and her husband Antonio had spread. As the Japanese Army pushed deeper in the country, the couple had intensified their activities of supplying medicine, food, clothes and messages to both Filipino war prisoners and American internees in concentration camps.

Lt. José L. Llanes, Commander of Ilocos Norte and Ilocos Sur, said he saw Josefa Llanes Escoda on 14 January 1944 in the presence of her husband, Antonio Escoda. Josefa Llanes Escoda left this final message to Lt. José L. Llanes:

Antonio was first arrested in June 1944, and Josefa Llanes Escoda was also arrested two months later on 27 August. She was imprisoned in Fort Santiago, the same prison as her husband, who was executed in 1944 along with General Vicente Lim, who was imprisoned with him. On 6 January 1945, Josefa Llanes Escoda was then taken and held in one of the buildings of Far Eastern University occupied by the Japanese. She was last seen alive on 6 January 1945, severely beaten and weak, and was transferred into a Japanese transport truck. It is presumed that she was executed and buried in an unmarked grave, either in the La Loma Cemetery or Manila Chinese Cemetery, which Japanese forces used as execution and burial grounds for thousands of Filipinos who resisted the Japanese occupation.

Legacy
A street and a building have been named after her and a monument has been dedicated to her memory. The Apayao – Ilocos Norte Road is also named after her, and was depicted on the current 1000-peso bill as one of three Filipinos martyred by the Japanese Armed Forces.

The Girl Scouts of the Philippines pay homage to Josefa Llanes Escoda every 20 September by celebrating her birth anniversary with activities that create further awareness of her martyrdom and contribution to youth development.

On 20 September 2018, a Google Doodle was created to commemorate her 120th birthday.

In popular culture
 Portrayed by Timmy Cruz in 1997 TV series of ABS-CBN's Bayani, in episodes "Josefa Llanes Escoda".

References

External links
 https://web.archive.org/web/20091027123219/http://geocities.com/sinupan/EscodaJ.htm
 http://msc.edu.ph/gsp/josefa.html
 108th Birth Anniversary of Josefa Llanes-Escoda

1898 births
1945 deaths
20th-century Filipino educators
Scouting in the Philippines
People from Ilocos Norte
Filipino suffragists
Enforced disappearances in the Philippines
People executed by Japanese occupation forces
University of the Philippines alumni
Executed Filipino women
Ilocano people
Burials at La Loma Cemetery
Philippine Normal University alumni
Filipino schoolteachers
Civilians killed in World War II